Mighty Attack is a compilation album mostly of hardcore punk artists from USA, and UK. It was originally released in 1999 in Japan as a 33 song CD.  The album was compiled by Flavour Records. The American version was compiled and released in 1998.

Track listing

Mighty Attack
Disc 1
 "Its Your Right" - The Wretch 2:45
 "Nobody Move" - UK Subs 1:34
 "Police State In The USA" - Anti-Flag 2:40
 "Stop The Production" - Corrupted Ideals 1:25
 "DMV" - No Use For A Name 3:08
 "Be My Girl" - Snap Her 2:07
 "Degenerated" - Reagan Youth 1:22
 "State Of Alert" - UK Subs 0:50
 "Loose Interpretation Of The Bomb" - Accustomed To Nothing 2:59
 "No Guts" - Loudmouths 1:59
 "Born Addicted" - No Use For A Name 2:39
 "USA"- Reagan Youth 1:20
 "All Laced Up" - Swingin' Utters 2:46
 "Die For The Government" - Anti-Flag 3:40
 "Thinking Of Suicide - Social Unrest 1:45
 "Its All Over" - Squat 2:03
 "The Bridge" - Samiam 3:20
 "Flossing With An E String" - Kraut 1:40
 "Slow Stupid & Hungry" - MDC 1:11
 "Corporate Life" - Hogan's Heroes 1:10
 "I Dont Care" - Corrupted Ideals 2:17
 "Tenderloin" - The Nukes 3:35
 "Home" - 2 Line Filler 3:18
 "In Need Of A Holiday" - Jack Killed Jill 3:06
 "Reggae Gets Big In A Small Town" - Swingin' Utters 1:33
 "Colossal Sleep" - Social Unrest 1:42
 "I Wanna Beavis You" - Snap Her 3:15
 "To You" - Dehumanized 2:58
 "Regret" - Samiam 3:49
 "Positive Dental Outlook" - Crucial Youth 0:49
 "Food For Thought" - Christ on a Crutch 1:23
 "Loony Toon" - No Use For A Name 1:49
 "NRA Jingle" - UK Subs 0:39

Reception

References

1999 compilation albums
1999 albums
Hardcore punk compilation albums
Record label compilation albums